Duță is a Romanian-language surname that may refer to:
Adrian Duță (b. 1953), Romanian politician, MP (1990–1992; 1992–1996)
Laurențiu Duță (b. 1976), Romanian singer and songwriter (3rei Sud Est)
Steluța Duță (b. 1982), Romanian boxer
Vasile Duță (1955–2016), Romanian politician, Senator  (2000–2004)

Romanian-language surnames